Rastsveatevite is a rare mineral of the eudialyte group with the chemical formula . Its structure is modular. It is only the third member of the group after andrianovite and davinciite with essential (site-dominating) potassium. Potassium and sodium enter both N4 and M2 sites. The mineral is named after Russian crystallographer Ramiza K. Rastsvetaeva.

Occurrence and association
Rastsvetaevite was originally found in hyperagpaitic (ultra-alkaline) pegmatite at Mt. Rasvumchorr, Khibiny massif, Kola Peninsula, Russia. Associated minerals are aegirine, nacaphite, nepheline, natrite, schcherbakovite, sodalite, villiaumite, and rasvumite.

Notes on crystal structure
The c unit cell parameter in rastsvetaevite is doubled.

References

Cyclosilicates
Sodium minerals
Potassium minerals
Calcium minerals
Iron minerals
Zirconium minerals
Trigonal minerals
Minerals in space group 160
Minerals described in 2003